Mahala is a word used in many languages and countries meaning neighborhood or location.

Mahala may also refer to:

Places

Bosnia and Herzegovina
 Mahala (Rogatica), a village in Rogatica Municipality, Republika Srpska
 , a village in Osmaci Municipality, Republika Srpska
 Mahala (Breza), a village in Breza Municipality, Federation of Bosnia and Herzegovina
 Donja Mahala, a village in Orašje Municipality, Federation of Bosnia and Herzegovina

Ukraine
 Mahala Lagoon, a lagoon in the Tuzly Lagoons group
 Mahala, Chernivtsi Oblast, a commune (selsoviet) in Chernivtsi Oblast

Elsewhere
 Mahala, Moldova, a village near Corjova, Dubăsari
 Mahala, Podgorica, a village in Golubovci City Municipality, Podgorica Capital City, Montenegro

People
 Mahala Andrews (1939–1997), British vertebrae palaeontologist
 Mahala Ashley Dickerson (1912–2007), American lawyer and civil rights advocate for women and minorities
 Mahala Wynns (born 1948), Deputy Governor of the Turks and Caicos Islands
 Genny Mahala (born 1992), Cameroonian handball player

Other
 Mahala Rai Banda, Romanian band